Philippe de Zara (1893-?) was a French journalist, novelist and travel writer. His travel book entitled Autour de la mer latine won the Prix Montyon from the Académie française in 1934. He was the co-editor of Le Front latin, a fascist journal, from 1935 to 1940.

Works

References

1893 births
French journalists
French novelists
Year of death missing